Aston Ignatius Sebastian Joseph Chichester, SJ (22 May 1879 – 24 October 1962) was the first Roman Catholic Archbishop of Salisbury (now Harare, Zimbabwe).

Background
Born in Ostend, Belgium of recusant English descent, he was educated at Mount St Mary's College, near Sheffield. He entered the Jesuits in 1913. He became a schoolteacher, and taught at the Jesuit schools, Beaumont and Wimbledon Colleges, at both of which he served as rector.

From 1929 on he served in Southern Rhodesia (which would later become the country known as Zimbabwe). Father Chichester was named the first Archbishop of Salisbury in 1955 and was also Titular Bishop of Ubaza. He attended the Second Vatican Council's first session as a Council Father. He died on 24 October 1962, aged 83, while attending the Council after collapsing on the steps of St. Peter's Basilica. He had been a priest for almost a half a century and served as bishop for more than three decades.

Shortly after he was pronounced dead, he was buried in the Society of Jesus' vault at the Campo Verano. His body would remain there until 13 March, 2009, when his body would be returned back to Zimbabwe.

References

External links
 Biography
 Catholic Hierarchy profile

1879 births
People from Harare
Participants in the Second Vatican Council
1962 deaths
Belgian people of English descent

Rhodesian Jesuits
Rhodesian Roman Catholic archbishops
Deaths in Vatican City
People from Ostend
White Rhodesian people
Belgian expatriates in Zimbabwe
British expatriates in Rhodesia
Jesuit bishops
Jesuit archbishops
Roman Catholic bishops of Harare
Roman Catholic archbishops of Harare
People educated at Mount St Mary's College